The Ogallala Aquifer is a shallow water table aquifer surrounded by sand, silt, clay, and gravel located beneath the Great Plains in the United States. It was named in 1898 by geologist N. H. Darton from its type locality near the town of Ogallala, Nebraska. The aquifer is part of the High Plains Aquifer System, and resides in the Ogallala Formation, which is the principal geologic unit underlying 80% of the High Plains.

Large-scale extraction for agricultural purposes started after World War II due partially to center pivot irrigation and to the adaptation of automotive engines for groundwater wells. Today about 27% of the irrigated land in the entire United States lies over the aquifer, which yields about 30% of the ground water used for irrigation in the United States. The aquifer is at risk of over-extraction and pollution. Since 1950, agricultural irrigation has reduced the saturated volume of the aquifer by an estimated 9%.  Once depleted, the aquifer will take over 6,000 years to replenish naturally through rainfall.

The aquifer system supplies drinking water to 82% of the 2.3 million people (1990 census) who live within the boundaries of the High Plains study area.

General characteristics
The deposition of aquifer material dates back two to six million years, from the late Miocene to early Pliocene ages when the southern Rocky Mountains were still tectonically active. From the uplands to the west, rivers and streams cut channels in a generally west to east or southeast direction. Erosion of the Rockies provided alluvial and aeolian sediment that filled the ancient channels and eventually covered the entire area of the present-day aquifer, forming the water-bearing Ogallala Formation. In that respect, the process is similar to those currently prevailing in other modern rivers of the area, such as the Kansas River and its tributaries. The major differences are time and depth.

The depth of the Ogallala varies with the shape of then-prevailing surface, being deepest where it fills ancient valleys and channels. The Ogallala Formation consists mostly of coarse sedimentary rocks in its deeper sections, which transition upward into finer-grained material. 

The water-saturated thickness of the Ogallala Formation ranges from a few feet to more than 1,000 feet. Its deepest part is 1200 ft. (300 m) and is generally greater in the Northern Plains. The depth of the water below the surface of the land ranges from almost  in parts of the north to between  throughout much of the south. Present-day recharge of the aquifer with fresh water occurs at an exceedingly slow rate, suggesting that much of the water in its pore spaces is paleowater, dating back to the most recent ice age and probably earlier.

Groundwater within the Ogallala generally flows from west to east at an average rate of a foot per day. Water quality within the Ogallala varies with the highest quality for drinking and irrigation in the northern region while the southern region had the poorest. Human and natural processes over the past 60 to 70 years, including irrigation density, climate, and nitrogen applications, have caused higher concentrations of contaminants including nitrates. Nitrate levels generally meet USGS water quality standards, but continue to gradually increase over time. This trend can impact the future groundwater sustainability for portions of the aquifer.

Aquifer water balance
An aquifer is a groundwater storage reservoir in the water cycle. While groundwater is a renewable source, reserves replenish relatively slowly. The USGS has performed several studies of the aquifer, to determine what is coming in (groundwater recharge from the surface), what is leaving (water pumped out and baseflow to streams), and what the net changes in storage are (rise, fall or no change).

Many farmers in the Texas High Plains, which rely particularly on groundwater, are now turning away from irrigated agriculture as pumping costs have risen and as they have become aware of the hazards of overpumping.

Groundwater recharge
The rate at which groundwater is recharged is limited by several factors. Much of the plains region is semiarid, with steady winds that hasten evaporation of surface water and precipitation. In many locations, the aquifer is overlain, in the vadose zone, with a shallow layer of caliche that is practically impermeable; this limits the amount of water able to recharge the aquifer from the land surface. However, the soil of the playa lakes is different and not lined with caliche, making these some of the few areas where the aquifer can recharge. The destruction of playas by farmers and development decreases the available recharge area. The prevalence of the caliche is partly due to the ready evaporation of soil moisture and the semiarid climate; the aridity increases the amount of evaporation, which in turn increases the amount of caliche in the soil. Both mechanisms reduce the amount of recharge water that reaches the water table.

Groundwater discharge

The regions overlying the Ogallala Aquifer are some of the most productive regions in the United States for ranching livestock, and growing corn, wheat, and soybeans. The success of large-scale farming in areas that do not have adequate precipitation and do not always have perennial surface water for diversion has depended heavily on pumping groundwater for irrigation.

Early settlers of the semiarid High Plains were plagued by crop failures due to cycles of drought, culminating in the disastrous Dust Bowl of the 1930s. Only after World War II, when center pivot irrigation became available, was the land mass of the High Plains aquifer system transformed into one of the most agriculturally productive regions in the world.

Change in groundwater storage
Ground water levels decline when the rate of extraction by irrigation exceeds the rate of recharge. At places, the water table was measured to drop more than 5 ft (1.5 m) per year at the time of maximum extraction. In extreme cases, the deepening of wells was required to reach the steadily falling water table. In the 21st century, recognition of the significance of the aquifer has led to increased coverage from regional and international journalists.

Water conservation practices (terracing and crop rotation), more efficient irrigation methods (center pivot and drip), and reduced area under irrigation have helped to slow depletion of the aquifer, but levels are generally still dropping in areas including southwestern Kansas and the Texas Panhandle. In other areas, such as parts of eastern and central Nebraska and of the region south of Lubbock, Texas, water levels have risen since 1980.

The center-pivot irrigator was described as the "villain" in a 2013 New York Times article, "Wells Dry, Fertile Plains Turn to Dust" recounting the relentless decline of parts of the Ogallala Aquifer. Sixty years of intensive farming using huge center-pivot irrigators has emptied parts of the High Plains Aquifer. Hundreds to thousands of years of rainfall would be needed to replace the groundwater in the depleted aquifer. In Kansas in 1950, irrigated cropland covered ; with the use of center-pivot irrigation, nearly three million acres of land were irrigated. In some places in the Texas Panhandle, the water table has been drained (dewatered). "Vast stretches of Texas farmland lying over the aquifer no longer support irrigation.

The center-pivot irrigation system is considered to be a highly efficient system which helps conserve water. However, by 2013, as the water consumption efficiency of the center-pivot irrigator improved over the years, farmers chose to plant more intensively, irrigate more land, and grow thirstier crops rather than reduce water consumption--an example of the Jevons Paradox in practice. One approach to reducing the amount of groundwater used is to employ treated recycled water for irrigation; another approach is to change to crops that require less water, such as sunflowers.

Several rivers, such as the Platte, run below the water level of the aquifer. Because of this, the rivers receive groundwater flow (baseflow), carrying it out of the region rather than recharging the aquifer.

The $46.1-million Optima Lake dam in western Oklahoma was rendered useless when the dropping level of the aquifer drastically reduced flow of the Beaver River, the lake's intended source of water.

Accelerated decline in aquifer storage

The depletion between 2001 and 2008, inclusive, is about 32% of the cumulative depletion during the entire 20th century. In the United States, the biggest users of water from aquifers include agricultural irrigation and oil and coal extraction. "Cumulative total groundwater depletion in the United States accelerated in the late 1940s and continued at an almost steady linear rate through the end of the century. In addition to widely recognized environmental consequences, groundwater depletion also adversely impacts the long-term sustainability of groundwater supplies to help meet the nation’s water needs."

Producers have taken steps to reduce their reliance on irrigated water. Streamlined operations allow them to produce significantly greater yield using roughly the same amount of water needed four decades ago. Still, losses to the aquifer between 2001 and 2011 equated to a third of its cumulative depletion during the entire 20th century. The Ogallala is recharged primarily by rainwater, but only about one inch of precipitation actually reaches the aquifer annually. Rainfall in most of the Texas High Plains is minimal, evaporation is high, and infiltration rates are slow.

During the 1990s, the aquifer held some three billion acre-feet of groundwater used for crop irrigation as well as drinking water in urban areas. The demand for the water outstrips its replenishment. The water level is particularly on the decline in Texas and New Mexico. Continued long-term use of the aquifer is "troublesome and in need of major reevaluation," according to the historian Paul H. Carlson, professor-emeritus from Texas Tech University in Lubbock. It was reported in 2020 that the aquifer would be "dry" within twenty years.

Environmental controversies

Proposed Keystone XL Pipeline

In 2008, TransCanada Corporation proposed the construction of the  Keystone XL pipeline to carry oil from the Athabasca oil sands of Alberta to refineries near Houston, Texas.
The proposed route of the pipeline crosses the eastern part of the Nebraska Sandhills; opponents of the route cite the risk to the Ogallala Aquifer posed by the possibility of contamination from spilled dilute bitumen.

Pipeline industry spokesmen have noted that thousands of miles of existing pipelines carrying crude oil and refined liquid hydrocarbons have crossed over the Ogallala Aquifer for years, in southeast Wyoming, eastern Colorado and New Mexico, western Nebraska, Kansas, Oklahoma, and Texas. The Pioneer crude oil pipeline crosses east-west across Nebraska, and the Pony Express pipeline, which crosses the Ogallala Aquifer in Colorado, Nebraska, and Kansas, was being converted as of 2013 from natural gas to crude oil, under a permit from the Federal Energy Regulatory Commission.

As the lead agency in the transboundary pipeline project, the U.S. State Department commissioned an environmental-impact assessment as required by the National Environmental Policy Act of 1969. The Environmental Impact Statement concluded that the project posed little threat of "adverse environmental impacts", the report was drafted by Cardno Entrix, a company that assisted both the Department of State and the Federal Energy Regulatory Commission in preparing environmental impact statements for other proposed TransCanada  projects. Although it is "common for companies applying to build government projects to be involved in assigning and paying for the impact analysis", several opponents of the project suggested there could be a conflict of interest.  In response to that concern, the Department of State's Office of the Inspector General conducted an investigation of the potential conflict of interest.   The February 2012 report of that investigation states no conflict of interest existed  either in the selection of the contractor or in the preparation of the environmental impact statement.

U.S. President Barack Obama "initially rejected the Keystone XL pipeline in January 2012, saying he wanted more time for an environmental review." On February 17, 2013, a rally at the National Mall drew an estimated 40,000 in protest of Keystone XL.

Early in his presidency, U.S President Donald Trump overturned U.S. President Barack Obama's decision by signing executive memos in support of the Keystone XL pipeline in January 2017. On January 20, 2021, President Joe Biden signed an executive order to revoke the permit that was granted to TC Energy Corporation for the Keystone XL Pipeline (Phase 4). On June 9, 2021, TC Energy abandoned plans for the Keystone XL Pipeline.

Conservation
Since 2010, the North Plains Groundwater Conservation District, which encompasses eight counties north of Amarillo, including Moore and Dallam Counties, has offered a $300,000 annual demonstration project to conserve water that farmers pump from the Ogallala Aquifer. Participating farmers grow corn with just over half of the water that they would normally require to irrigate the fields, or they plant several weeks later than customary. Pivot sprinklers are used in the project, rather than the more expensive drip irrigation. According to district manager Steve Walthour, conservation is essential considering declining levels of the aquifer. The local non-profit organization Ogallala Commons, named for the aquifer itself, which not only collaborates and supports the local communicates, also works to conserve the Ogallala Aquifer and the surrounding area.

Eleven farmers in 2013 participated in the conservation program, with some planting in dry earth, rather than watered soil. They are leaving more space between plants,  a technique that retains moisture for a longer period of time. Soil sensors permit farmers to gather accurate information about the moisture level of their crops. The motivation to save water comes from the district's regulations on extracting water from the aquifer. The United States Geological Survey determined the water level in the aquifer has dropped more in Texas than in any other state in the basin.

Farmers on their own land may draw water from the aquifer without charge. Pumping costs are low because the fuel used, natural gas, is inexpensive. The North Plains district first established limits on pumping in 2005 and tightened the regulations four years later. Certain wells are now required to have meters. Yet another challenge facing the district is that higher prices for crops have prompted some to plant additional fields and further increase the use of water from the aquifer.

See also

Aquifer
Environmental science
Fossil water
Great Recycling and Northern Development Canal
Groundwater
Guarani Aquifer
Hydrogeology
Irrigation
Laurentide Ice Sheet
Llano Estacado
Water table
Western Interior Seaway, the salt-water strait that once covered the area of today's Ogalalla Aquifer.

References

External links

"The Ogallala Aquifer" Manjula V. Guru, Agricultural Policy Specialist and James E. Horne, President & CEO, The Kerr Center for Sustainable Agriculture, Poteau, Oklahoma
USGS High Plains Regional Groundwater Study
A Legal Fight in Texas over the Ogallala Aquifer
Kansas Geological Survey information on the High Plains / Ogallala Aquifer
Rapid Recharge of Parts of the High Plains Aquifer Indicated by a Reconnaissance Study in Oklahoma

Aquifers in the United States
Great Plains
Regions of the Western United States
Geology of Oklahoma
Geology of South Dakota
Geology of Nebraska
Geology of Kansas
Geology of Wyoming
Geology of Texas
Geology of Colorado
Geology of New Mexico